Bermudagidiella bermudiensis is a species of crustacean in the family Bogidiellidae. It is the only species in the genus Bermudagidiella, and is endemic to Bermuda.

References

Gammaridea
Endemic fauna of Bermuda
Monotypic crustacean genera
Taxonomy articles created by Polbot
Taxobox binomials not recognized by IUCN